Semagystia clathrata is a moth in the family Cossidae. It was described by Hugo Theodor Christoph in 1884. It is found in Uzbekistan, Turkmenistan and Turkey.

References

Arctiidae genus list. Butterflies and Moths of the World. Natural History Museum, London.

Cossinae
Moths described in 1884